Leutnant Hans Rosencrantz (9 August 1890 – 6 September 1916) was a German World War I flying ace credited with five aerial victories, shared with his pilot Wilhelm Fahlbusch.

Biography
See also Aerial victory standards of World War I

Hans Rosencrantz (sometimes called Hermann) was born on 9 August 1890 in Wöllstein, Grand Duchy of Hesse, the German Empire.

Rosencrantz served during the First World War as an aerial observer in Kagohl 1. The observer manned the rear gun in the two-seater Roland Whale. In concert with his pilot, Wilhelm Fahlbusch, he shot down four enemy airplanes in early 1916. On 31 August, they shot down a Martinsyde G100 from No. 27 Squadron RFC for their fifth aerial victory, and became aces.

On 6 September 1916, Rosencrantz and Fahlbusch engaged Sopwith 1 1/2 Strutter two-seater fighters from No. 70 Squadron RFC. The German duo were shot down in flames over Malincourt, France. Credit for their demise was given to Bernard Paul Gascoigne Beanlands, William Sanday, and their observers.

End notes

Reference
 Above the Lines: The Aces and Fighter Units of the German Air Service, Naval Air Service and Flanders Marine Corps, 1914–1918. Norman Franks, Frank W. Bailey, Russell Guest. Grub Street, 1993. , .

German World War I flying aces
1890 births
1916 deaths
People from Alzey-Worms
People from Rhenish Hesse
Prussian Army personnel
Luftstreitkräfte personnel
German military personnel killed in World War I
Aviators killed by being shot down
Recipients of the Iron Cross (1914), 1st class
Military personnel from Rhineland-Palatinate